The men's 60 metres at the 2010 IAAF World Indoor Championships was held at the ASPIRE Dome on 12 and 13 March.

Coming into the championships, Ivory Williams had run a world-leading time of 6.49 seconds to win the US indoor championships, positioning him as a possible gold medallist. However, he tested positive for marijuana and he received a three-month ban, while his world-leading performance was annulled. This made Dwain Chambers the competitor with the best pre-championships form, closely followed by Mike Rodgers, Nesta Carter and Daniel Bailey.

Chambers led the field on the first day heats, followed by Trell Kimmons and the home athlete Samuel Francis (athlete). Little-known Ryan Moseley upset the favourites in the sixth heat in which Lerone Clarke of Jamaica was eliminated. Clarke was the only surprise non-qualifier of the round, although Rolf Fongué was the first athlete to fall foul of the no false start rule at a global championships – a rule introduced at the start of the 2010 season.
On the second day of competition, Chambers (6.51) and Kimmons (6.55) were again the fastest qualifiers in the semi-finals, with Mike Rodgers and Daniel Bailey improving as the rounds progressed. Nesta Carter and Ronald Pognon were the other semifinal leaders, while Francis progressed as a fastest-loser. Ibrahim Kabia and Rodney Green both ran national record times of 6.65 as did 2008 Olympic fourth placer Churandy Martina. However, only Kabia won selection for the final eight. Harry Aikines-Aryeetey, one of the fastest of the season, pulled up with an injury.

In the last day round of the competition, Rodgers and Bailey made quick starts to lead the final. However, Chambers hit his top speed to pull ahead of his rivals and leant at the line for the victory. The final saw a number of career firsts for athletes: Chambers won the race in 6.48 seconds (a world-leading time) to become the oldest ever winner of the event at 31, which was also his first ever world title after winning silver in 2008. Mike Rodgers was the next athlete home and his silver was his first ever medal on a global stage. Daniel Bailey had become the first ever Antiguan to reach a world indoor final, and he duly improved upon the feat to take the bronze to become the island nation's first ever medallist. Trell Kimmons, who was only a last minute replacement for Ivory Williams, took fourth place.

Medalists

Records

Qualification standards

Schedule

Results

Heats

Qualification: First 3 in each heat (Q) and the next 3 fastest (q) advance to the semifinals.

Semifinals

Qualification: First 2 in each heat (Q) and the next 2 fastest (q) advance to the final.

Final

References

Results
Heats results
Semifinals results
Final result

60 metres
60 metres at the World Athletics Indoor Championships